Seyed Farshad Fatemi Ardestani (born 15 May 1973) is an Iranian economist and a member of Iranian National Competition Council.
He is Assistant Professor of Economics and Vice President for Administration and Finance at Sharif University of Technology.
Fatemi is known for his works on game theory and industrial organization.

References

External links
Farshad Fatemi

Living people
Iranian economists
Academic staff of Sharif University of Technology
Alumni of University College London
1973 births
Alumni of the University of Essex
Game theorists